Kerry Logistics Network Limited is a listed company engaged in third party logistics, freight services,  warehouse operations, and supply chain solutions. It was listed on 19 December 2013, raising over US$280 million, as a spin-off of Kerry Properties Limited.

Kerry Logistics is headquartered in Kwai Chung, Hong Kong. As of 2020, they managed  of logistics facilities globally ( of which is self-owned), with a fleet of 10,000+ self-owned vehicles operating in 59 countries and territories.

Hong Kong 
Before incorporation, its first established warehouse in Hong Kong was built in 1981. The company was established in 1991. In 1999, they opened their flagship logistics facility, Kerry Cargo Centre, a  multi-storey combined logistics facility and global HQ office.

The company name was changed to “Kerry Logistics Network Limited” in 2000, the same year they began to provide truck freight services to warehousing customers. International freight forwarding operations also began shortly after in Hong Kong through the acquisition of Kerry Freight (Hong Kong) Limited (previously named “R&B Transports Limited”).

The Group generated a revenue of over HK$53 billion in 2020 and is the largest international logistics company listed on the Hong Kong Stock Exchange (Stock Code 0636.HK) as well as a selected Member of the Hang Seng Corporate Sustainability Index Series 2020-2021.

Mainland China 
In 2003, in collaboration with a joint venture partner, the first logistics centre in China was developed. In 2005, the China division acquired a 70% equity interest in EAS, and the new joint entity was renamed Kerry EAS Logistics ("KEAS"). EAS, a Chinese state-owned enterprise, was one of the leading domestic freight and warehousing entities in China at the time.

The revenue in Mainland China was HK$8 billion, or about 38% of the total group revenue.

Taiwan 
In 2004, KLN commenced freight forwarding operations in Taiwan. In 2008, they acquired an initial equity interest in Kerry TJ Logistics, previously named “T. Join Transportation Co., Ltd”. As of the end of 2016, KLN held a total equity interest of approximately 49.67% in Kerry TJ Logistics.

Kerry TJ Logistics is a major logistics service provider in Taiwan whose shares have been listed on the Taiwan Stock Exchange since 1990. It has an extensive distribution network supported by a fleet of more than 3,000 trucks.

ASEAN 

KLN's business in ASEAN (Southeast Asia) started in 2002, with both integrated logistics and international freight forwarding operations in Thailand. In 2004, KLN acquired an initial equity interest in Kerry Siam Seaport Limited (formerly Siam Seaport Terminal & Warehouses Co., Ltd.). As of 2013, KLN holds 79.52% interest in Kerry Siam Seaport Limited. Kerry Siam Seaport Limited operates Kerry Siam Seaport, a multi-purpose port terminal located near Laem Chabang.

Since 2004, KLN has continued to expand into other ASEAN countries by establishing international freight offices in Singapore, Malaysia, Indonesia, Cambodia, the Philippines, Vietnam and Myanmar.

United Kingdom 
KLN commenced European freight forwarding operations in the United Kingdom in 2002, by acquiring an initial equity interest in Kerry Logistics (UK) (previously named “Trident International Limited”). In 2013, KLN acquired the remaining equity interest, making Kerry Logistics (UK) a wholly owned subsidiary of KLN.

Indev Logistics, India 
On 13 April 2016, Kerry Logistics announced the acquisition of a 50% stake in Indev Logistics Pvt. Ltd. (Indev), a Chennai-based logistics company. The stake value is estimated to be around Rs 1,000 crore. By 2018, the company is also planning to list in the Indian markets. Once this investment plan takes effect, Indev will be rebranded as Kerry-INDEV, in line with Kerry's ambition to becoming a major pan-Indian logistics company with an India focus.

See also 
 Kerry Properties Limited

References

External links
Kerry Logistics Network

Transport companies established in 1981
Companies listed on the Hong Kong Stock Exchange
Logistics companies of Hong Kong
Multinational companies headquartered in Hong Kong
Hong Kong brands